The Battle of Mendaza was an early battle of the First Carlist War, occurring on December 12, 1834, at Mendaza, Navarre.

The Carlists had enjoyed a victory in the Battle of Venta de Echavarri in October and also the fruits of a raid on Navarre, in which Tomás de Zumalacárregui would station himself at La Berrueza with a number of supplies, clothes, money, and new troops.  The morale of the Carlists was very high, and they decided to fight the Liberal troops in a formal battle (rather than with guerrilla tactics). This would happen on December 14, 1834, at the Battle of Mendaza.

Tomás de Zumalacárregui concentrated his forces at the bottom of the valley of La Berrueza between Mendaza and Asarta.

Luis Fernández de Córdova's forces were stationed outside of this valley, at Los Arcos.

Zumalacárregui attempted to follow a plan of battle similar to that enacted by Hannibal at Cannae: he would allow enemy forces to drive themselves into a large arc — whereupon the Carlist infantry, positioned on the flanks in the forests of Holm oaks on the mountain of Dos Hermanas, would encircle the main body of Liberal infantry and destroy it.

However, the Liberal leader of the vanguard, Marcelino Oráa, himself a Navarrese and familiar with the terrain, recognized the potential trap and instead marched towards Mendaza rather than through the valley itself.  The Carlists, surprised by this maneuver and inexperienced on the field of battle, were thrown back and retreated, taking refuge in the mountains.

Sources 
First hand accounts:
C.F. Henningsen. Campaña de doce meses en Navarra y las Provincias Vascongadas con el General Zumalacárregui. Madrid 1935
Alexis Sabatier. Tío Tomás. Souvenirs d'un soldat de Charles V. Chez Granet. Bordeaux 1836
Juan Antonio Zaratiegui. Vida y hechos de D. Tomás de Zumalacárregui. Escelicer, S.L. San Sebastián 1946
Fernando Fernández de Córdova. Mis memorias íntimas. Madrid 1886-1889
Luis Fernández de Córdova. Memoria justificativa... París 1837
Marcelino Oráa. Conducta militar y política del Teniente General D. Marcelino Oraá... Madrid 1847

Secondary:
Antonio Pirala. Historia de la guerra carlista y de los partidos liberal y carlista. Segunda edición. Madrid 1867-1871
José M. Azcona. Zumalacárregui. Estudio crítico de las fuentes históricas de su tiempo. Instituto de Estudios Políticos. Madrid 1946
Francisco de Paula Madrazo. Historia militar y política de Zumalacárregui. Librería Santarén. Valladolid 1941
Isidoro Magués. Don Carlos e i suoi Difensori. Firenze. Batelli e Figli 1837
Benjamín Jarnés. Zumalacárregui. El caudillo romántico. Madrid 1972

Mendaza
Mendaza
1834 in Spain
Mendaza
December 1834 events